Olympic Hall is a music venue located within the Olympic Park, in Bangi-dong, Songpa-gu, Seoul, South Korea.

In 2011, the Olympic Hall was renovated as a concert hall by the Ministry of Culture, Sports and Tourism and the Korea Sports Promotion Foundation. The one-year remodeling project included an expanded stage for the 2,452 seat main hall, an exhibition room to showcase the history of Korean pop from the 1920s to present day, and a 240-seat small theater for indie musicians and new artists. It was reopened on 22 June 2011 with a celebration performance by veteran singers and K-pop groups including Super Junior, 2PM, 4Minute, 2NE1 and After School.

Notable events
2010–2012
 Kings of Convenience: Kings of Convenience Live in Seoul – March 2010 
 The Swell Season: The Swell Season Live in Seoul – 7 April 2010
 2NE1: NOLZA 2011 – 26, 27 and 28 August 2011
 Jay Park: New Breed Live in Seoul – 3 March 2012
 Jay Park: New Breed Asia Tour in Seoul – 18 August 2012
 Sistar: Femme Fatale – 15 September 2012
 Hey! Say! JUMP: JUMP WORLD 2012 - South Korean Leg - 23 and 24 June 2012

2013
 BoA: Here I Am – 2013 Special Live – 26 and 27 January
 2nd Gaon Chart K-Pop Awards – 13 February
 B.A.P: B.A.P – Live on earth – 23 and 24 February
 Sistar: S – 12 October

2014
 Teen Top: Teen Top 2014 World Tour HIGH KICK – 22 and 23 February
 BTS: BTS Global Official Fanclub A.R.M.Y 1ST Muster – 29 March
 Block B:  2014 Blockbuster – 17 and 18 May
 VIXX: VIXX Live Fantasia [HEX SIGN] – 18, 19, and 20 July 
 Mariah Carey: The Elusive Chanteuse Show – 8 October
 Taeyang: 2014 Taeyang Concert – 10, 11 and 12 October 
 Roy Kim: "Roy Kim Live Tour: HOME 2014" – 25 and 26 October
 BtoB: Hello Melody – 31 October and 1 November 2014
 Boyfriend: 2014 Boyfriend, The First Chapter in Seoul "Bewitch" – 23 November
 MBLAQ: Curtain Call – 29 and 30 November

2015
 Apink: Pink Paradise – 30 and 31 January
 BTS: 2015 BTS Live Trilogy Episode I: BTS Begins – 28 and 29 March
 Ailee: Fatal Attraction – 4 July
 F.T. Island: 2015 F.T. Island Live 'We Will – 8 and 9 August
 Super Junior K.R.Y.: Super Junior-K.R.Y. Asia Tour ~Phonograph~ – 22 and 23 August
 [[Lee Jun-ho (singer)|Junhou]: Last Night in Seoul – 19 and 20 September
 SG Wannabe: SG Wannabe comeback concert 'I Wanna Be In You''' – 9 and 10 October
 Sweet Sorrow: Sweet Sorrow 10th Anniversary Concert – 13, 14, and 15 November
 IU: Chat-Shire – 21 and 22 November
 Jinusean: 2015 Jinusean Concert 'Jinusean Bomb' – 13 December

2016
 f(x): f(x) The 1st Concert Dimension 4 – Docking Station – 29, 30 and 31 January
 5th Gaon Chart K-Pop Awards – 17 February
 Taeyeon: Butterfly Kiss – 9 and 10 July
 Mamamoo: 2016 Mamamoo Concert Moosical – 13 and 14 August
 Antenna artists: Hello, Antenna: The Label Concert – 23, 24 and 25 September

2017
 AOMG: Follow The Movement – 11 and 12 February
 Mamamoo: 2017 Mamamoo Concert Moosical: Curtain Call – 3, 4 and 5 March
 AOA: AOA 1st Concert 'Ace of Angels' in Seoul – 11 March
 Taeyeon: Persona – 12, 13, and 14 May
 Monsta X: Beautiful World Tour – 17 and 18 June
 Produce 101 Season 2: Finale Concert – 1 and 2 July
 Astro: The 1st ASTROAD to Seoul – 15 and 16 July
 Lovelyz: Lovelyz 2017 Summer Concert [Alwayz] – 29 and 30 July
 Girls' Generation: Girls' Generation 10th Anniversary – Holiday to Remember – 5 August
 Boys24: Boys24 The Final – 12 August
 Red Velvet: Red Room: Red Velvet First Concert – 18, 19 and 20 August
 Taemin: Taemin 1st Solo Concert: OFF-SICK – 25, 26 and 27 August
 Dream Theater: Images, Words & Beyond 25th Anniversary Tour - 16 September
 VIXX LR: VIXX LR 1st Concert 'Eclipse' in Seoul – 18 and 19 November

2018
 GFriend: Season of GFriend – 6 and 7 January
 JBJ: JBJ 1st Concert: A Really Desirable Concert – 3 and 4 February
 Day6: Every Day6 Finale Concert — The Best Moments — 3 and 4 March
iKON Private Stage [RE-KONNECT] - 11 March
 OneRepublic: 2018 Asia Tour – 27 April
iKON Private Stage [KOLORFUL] - 9 June
 Loona: Loonabirth: Debut concert – 19 of August
 Mayday: Life Tour – 8 September
 Stray Kids:  Unveil  Op. 3: I Am YOU  – 21 October
 Iz*One: Color*Iz Show-Con – 29 October
Ailee: I AM: Ailee Tour – 8 and 9 December

2019
 The Boyz: THE BOYZ FAN-CON <THE CASTLE> - 25, 26 of January
 Loona: Loonaverse: Concert - 16, 17 of February
 Lovelyz: Lovelyz 2019 Summer Concert [Alwayz 2] – 2, 3 and 4 August
 Blackpink: 2019 Private Stage [Chapter 1] – 21 September
 Sekai no Owari: TOUR 2019 『The Colors』 - 2 November
 Stray Kids: World Tour “District 9: Unlock” – 23 and 24 November

2020
Victon: Victon 1st Concert [New World] – 4 and 5 January
Apink: 2020 Apink 6th concert: Welcome to Pink World – 1 and 2 February
Ateez: Ateez World Tour "The Fellowship: Map The Treasure" – 8 and 9 February

2021
Treasure: Treasure 1st Private Stage [Teu-Day] – 2 October
Mino: YG Palm Stage — 2021 Mino: Maniac – 19 November 
Kang Seung-yoon: YG Palm Stage — 2021 Yoon: Passage – 21 November2022
Ateez: Ateez World Tour "The Fellowship: Beginning of the End" - 7, 8 and 9 January
Stray Kids: Stray Kids 2nd #LoveSTAY "SKZ's Chocolate Factory" - 12 and 13 February
Tomorrow X Together: Third Fanlive "Moa X Together" - 5 and 6 March
Cravity: Cravity The 1st Concert [Center of Gravity] - 2 and 3 April
Treasure: Treasure 1st Concert [Trace] - 9 and 10 April 
Winner: Winner 2022 Concert [The Circle]  - 30 April and 1 May
WJSN: 2022 WJSN Concert [Wonderland] - 11 and 12 June
(G)I-dle: Just MeI-dle World Tour -17, 18 and 19 June
iKON: "iKON 2022 Concert" - 25 and 26 June
Mamamoo: Mamamoo World Tour [My Con] - 18, 19 and 20 November
Jannabi: Fantastic Old-fashioned End of the Year Party! - 26, 27 November, 31 December, 1, 28 and 29 January 
Xdinary Heroes: Xdinary Heroes Stage ♭: Overture - 16, 17 and 18 December 2022

2023
Ive: Ive The 1st Fan Concert <The Prom Queens> - 11 and 12 February 2023
Onew - Onew 1st Concert "O-New-Note" - 3, 4, and 5 March 2023
BoA - BoA 20th Anniversary Live "The BoA : Musicality" - 11 and 12 March 2023
Le Sserafim - Le Sserafim Fan Meeting <Fearnada> 2023 S/S - 18 and 19 March 2023
Apink - 2023 Apink Fan Concert <Pink drive> - 14 and 15 April 2023

References

External links

Music venues in Seoul
Concert halls in South Korea
Olympic Park, Seoul
Buildings and structures in Songpa District